St John the Evangelist's Church may refer to:

United Kingdom
 St John the Evangelist's Church, Abram, an active Anglican church
 St John the Evangelist's Church, Alvanley, an active Anglican church
 St John the Evangelist's Church, Ashton Hayes, an active Anglican church
 St John the Evangelist's Church, Blackheath, an active Anglican church
 St John the Evangelist's Church, Burgess Hill, an active Anglican church
 St John the Evangelist's Church, Byley, an active Anglican church
 St John the Evangelist's Church, Cadeby, a redundant Anglican church
 St John the Evangelist's Church, Cambridge, an active Anglican church
 St John the Evangelist's Church, Carlton in Lindrick, an active Anglican church
 St John the Evangelist's Church, Chelford, an active Anglican church
 St John the Evangelist's Church, Chichester, a redundant Anglican church
 St John the Evangelist's Church, Clifton, an active Anglican church
 St John the Evangelist's Church, Corby Glen, an active Anglican church
 St John the Evangelist's Church, Cowgill, an active Anglican church
 St John the Evangelist's Church, Crawshawbooth, an active Anglican church
 St John the Evangelist's Church, Crosscanonby, an active Anglican church
 St John the Evangelist's Church, Farnworth, an active Anglican church
 St John the Evangelist's Church, Greenock, an active Anglican church
 St John the Evangelist's Church, Gressingham, an active Anglican church
 St John the Evangelist's Church, Kingsley, an active Anglican church
 St John the Evangelist's Church, Kirkdale, an active Roman Catholic church
 St John the Evangelist's Church, Kirkham, an active Roman Catholic church
 St John the Evangelist's Church, Lancaster, a redundant Anglican church
 St John the Evangelist's Church, Leeds, a redundant Anglican church
 St John the Evangelist's Church, Mold, a redundant Welsh church
 St John the Evangelist's Church, Newton Arlosh, an active Anglican church
 St John the Evangelist's Church, Norley, an active Anglican church
 St John the Evangelist's Church, Osmotherley, an active Anglican church
 St John the Evangelist's Church, Otterburn, a church built in 1857 by three sisters
 St John the Evangelist's Church, Penge, an active Anglican church
 St John the Evangelist's Church, Preston Village, an active Anglican church
 St John the Evangelist's Church, Sandbach Heath, an active Anglican church
 St John the Evangelist's Church, Sandiway, an active Anglican church
 St John the Evangelist's Church, St Leonards-on-Sea, an active Anglican church
 St John the Evangelist's Church, Toft, an active Anglican church
 St John the Evangelist's Church, Turncroft, a demolished Anglican church
 St John the Evangelist's Church, Warrington, an active Anglican church
 St John the Evangelist's Church, Weston, an active Anglican church
 St John the Evangelist's Church, Winsford, an active Anglican church
 St John the Evangelist's Church, Woodland, an active Anglican church
 St John the Evangelist's Church, Worsthorne, an active Anglican church

United States
 St. John the Evangelist's Church (Manhattan), an active Roman Catholic church
 St. John the Evangelist's Church (Pawling), an active Roman Catholic church

See also
 St. John the Evangelist Church (disambiguation)